Bradley Nielsen (born 26 October 1979) is a New Zealand former cricketer. He played seven first-class matches for Auckland between 2001 and 2003.

See also
 List of Auckland representative cricketers

References

External links
 

1979 births
Living people
New Zealand cricketers
Auckland cricketers
Cricketers from Auckland